The SPL Kaakkois-Suomen piiri (South Eastern Finland Football Association) is one of the 12 district organizations of the Football Association of Finland. It administers lower-tier football in South Eastern Finland.

Background 

Suomen Palloliitto Kaakkois-Suomen piiri, commonly referred to as SPL Kaakkois-Suomen piiri or SPL Kaakkois-Suomi, is the governing body for football in South Eastern Finland. The organisation was established on 24 November 1994 and had 84 different clubs with 370 teams and 8,433 registered players in February 2010. Based in Lappeenranta, the Association's Director is Veijo Vainikka.

Member clubs

League Competitions 
SPL Kaakkois-Suomen piiri run the following league competitions:

Men's Football
 Division 3 - Kolmonen  -  one section
 Division 4 - Nelonen  -  one section
 Division 5 - Vitonen  -  two sections
 Division 6 - Kutonen  -  three sections

Ladies Football
 Division 3 - Kolmonen  -  one section

Footnotes

References

External links 
 SPL Kaakkois-Suomen piiri Official Website 

K
Sports organizations established in 1994